Boomer, or baby boomer, is a child born between 1946 and 1964.

Boomer may refer to:

People 
 Boomers (Oklahoma settlers), two groups of settlers
 Boomer (surname)
 Boomer (nickname)

Places 
 Boomer Township, Pottawattamie County, Iowa
 Boomer Township, Wilkes County, North Carolina
 Boomer, Missouri
 Boomer, West Virginia, a census-designated place
 Boomer Lake, an artificial reservoir in Stillwater, Oklahoma
 Boomer Island (Tasmania), Australia

Animals 
 An adult male kangaroo, nicknamed "boomer" in Australia
 An alternate name for the mountain beaver
 A colloquial name for the American red squirrel
 The greater prairie chicken, a type of grouse native to North America
 Marc Maron's cat

Characters

Comics 
 Owen Mercer, the current Captain Boomerang in the DC Comics universe, nicknamed "Boomer"
 Rotor Walrus, a character from Sonic the Hedgehog, nicknamed "Boomer" in early issues
 Tabitha Smith, a Marvel Comics comic book superhero, formerly called Boomer
 Boomer, a canine character, Poncho's best friend, in Pooch Café

Video games
 Boomers, a faction of xenophobic people in Fallout: New Vegas
 The Boomer, a recurring Special Infected in the Left 4 Dead series
 Boomers, heavily armored soldiers of the locust horde in the Gears of War series
 Boomer, a character in the Skylanders video game, known for wielding explosives enthusiastically
Boomer, a playable clown character in the Ballz fighting game
Boomer, a character that appeared in Super Mario RPG
Boomer, a pixl in the game Super Paper Mario
Boomer, a canine side-kick in Far Cry 5
Boomer, a Bot in Rocket League

Television 
 Lieutenant Boomer, a character in the 1978 television series Battlestar Galactica
 Sharon Valerii, a character in the 2004 television series Battlestar Galactica, call-sign "Boomer"
 Dr. Jack "Boomer" Morrison, a character on the U.S. television show St. Elsewhere
 Boomer, an anthropomorphic tug boat from the 1989 TV series, Tugs
 Boomer (Bubblegum Crisis), a fictional synthetic life form in the anime series Bubblegum Crisis
 Boomer, the blond member of the Rowdyruff Boys, a trio of villains in the animated series The Powerpuff Girls
 Boomer Bledsoe, a member of Roger Klotz' gang in the animated series Doug
 Boomer, the title character, a dog, in the 1980 TV series Here's Boomer
 Boomer Parker, one of the twin protagonists of the American sitcom Pair of Kings
 Boomer, one of the main protagonists in the TV series Redakai: Conquer the Kairu
 Sue "Boomer" Jenkins, a character in the Australian drama series Wentworth
 Boomers (TV series), a 2014 BBC One television comedy series

Others 
 Boomer, a woodpecker in the 1981 animated Disney film The Fox and the Hound
 Captain Boomer, a British whaling ship captain who appears briefly in Herman Melville's Moby-Dick
 Boomer, the redhead tomboy in Burger King Kids Club advertising
 Boomer, a monument statue by western artist Harold T. Holden, located in Enid, Oklahoma, dedicated in 1987
 Boomers, a tentative title for the role-playing game Rifts
 Coach Boomer, aka Sonic Boom; the coach in the 2005 film Sky High
 Boomer Badger, character from the National Wildlife Federation's Ranger Rick magazine

Sports

Teams 
 Australia men's national basketball team, officially nicknamed "Australian Boomers"
 Bulleen Boomers, a basketball club based in Bulleen, a north-eastern suburb of Melbourne, Victoria, Australia
 Calgary Boomers, a former professional association football team in Calgary, Alberta, Canada
 Melbourne Boomers, an Australian women's basketball club
 Schaumburg Boomers, a Frontier League baseball team based in Schaumburg, Illinois

Mascots 
 Boomer (mascot), the mascot of the NBA's Indiana Pacers
 Boomer, mascot of the Missouri State University Bears
 Boomer, mascot of the Port Vale F.C., an association football (soccer) club
 Boomer Baller, mascot of the Kannapolis Cannon Ballers minor league baseball team 
 Boomer the Bear, mascot of the Western Hockey League's Spokane Chiefs
 Boomer the Bulldog, mascot for Dean College's sports teams
 Boomer and Sooner, mascots for the University of Oklahoma's sports teams
 Buzz and Boomer, mascots of the Canadian Football League's  Winnipeg Blue Bombers

In the military 
 A ballistic missile submarine in American naval slang
 VT-27, a US Navy training squadron nicknamed the "Boomers"

Other uses
 The Boomers (band), a Canadian rock band from Ontario
 Boomers! Parks, a theme park / family entertainment center chain
 Boomer, a freeware pharmacokinetic modeling software

See also 
 Boom (disambiguation)
 
 Boom Boom (disambiguation)